Zooloretto is a board game designed by Michael Schacht, published in 2007 by Abacus Spiele and in English by Rio Grande Games.  The premise of the game is that each player is the owner of a zoo, and must collect animals in order to attract visitors to their zoo (thus scoring points to win the game).  Having full, or nearly full, animal enclosures scores more points. However, if a player has too many animals such that they must be stored in their "barn", this causes them to lose points.  Vending stalls also offer a means for players to score points with enclosures that are not full.

The method that players use to collect animals is based on the mechanics of the card game Coloretto (also designed by Michael Schacht).

Expansions and spin-offs
Three large expansions have been published, XXL, Exotic, and Boss. Numerous small expansions have been published, many of which are available for download (at no cost) at the publisher's website. These include extra animal enclosures, a petting zoo, restaurant, souvenir shop, and pavilions, each of which offers different opportunities for players to score points or money. An additional large expansion, Aquaretto, can be played as a stand-alone game or in combination with Zooloretto.

Digital versions
An iPhone and iPod Touch version was developed by Spinbottle games and published by Chillingo in May 2009.

Zooloretto for PC (including digitally via Steam) was developed by White Bear Studios and published in 2011. Nintendo DS and Wii versions were in deployment but canceled   The game has a single player campaign mode and a multiplayer mode. The game can be played (just like the board game) with five local players, with no online option.

Animals
 Flamingo
 Camel
 Leopard
 Elephant
 Panda
 Chimpanzee
 Zebra
 Kangaroo
 Lion
 Rabbit

NOTE: The lion is on the King of the Beasts edition of the game.  Both the Lion and Rabbit are available as a Promo from their webstore.

Awards
Winner of the Spiel des Jahres 2007
Winner of the Golden Geek Awards for Best Family Game and Best Children's Game
5th place Deutscher Spielepreis 2007
Finalist Game of the Year in Finland 2007
Spieleblitzlichter 2007
Japan Boardgame Prize 2007 for Best Foreign Game for Beginners

References

External links

Schacht's 

Brief game review by Bruno Faidutti (in French and English)

YouTube video of iPhone version

Biology-themed board games
Board games with a modular board
Michael Schacht games
Spiel des Jahres winners
Rio Grande Games games
Board games introduced in 2007